The Detroit Free Press Marathon is a  race run every third Sunday in October in Detroit, Michigan, United States and Windsor, Ontario, Canada since 1978.  Major General Stan Connelly and Jerry Coyle organized the first international marathon.  MaryJane Hatton, recorded the times as the runners crossed the finish line.  After each marathon Stan Connelly and his daughter MaryJane Hatton would compile a booklet entitled, “We’re All Winners” of every runner and their times. The marathon course is international and has featured the Detroit-Windsor Tunnel for all but two years of its existence.  The current course crosses the Ambassador Bridge and the Detroit-Windsor Tunnel between Detroit and Windsor. Due to its use of the tunnel, the race is able to boast that it has the only official underwater international mile in the world, as the tunnel runs underneath the Detroit River. The race is a USATF-certified, Boston-qualifier course.

The race weekend also features an international half-marathon, a U.S.-Only half-marathon, a relay, a 5K, a 1-mile and a Kids fun run.

History 
The predecessor to this race was the Motor City Marathon which started in 1963 and featured multiple laps on Belle Isle.

The marathon was first held in 1978.

From 1978 to 1998 the race started in Windsor and finished in Detroit. The race has had several other sponsors, changing the name slightly each time.

2009's field was a record 19,326 runners who participated.

The 2020 in-person edition of the race was canceled due to the coronavirus pandemic. Registrants were given the option of running the race on their own courses, transferring their entry to 2021 or 2022, or obtaining a 50 percent refund.

Winners

References

External links 
Detroit Free Press Marathon
Findamarathon.com – Detroit Marathon

Marathons in the United States
Marathons in Canada
Sports competitions in Detroit
Detroit Free Press
Sport in Windsor, Ontario